"Enuff" is a song by the American hip hop producer DJ Shadow featuring the American rappers Q-Tip and Lateef the Truthspeaker, released on September 25, 2006 as the second single from his third studio album The Outsider (2006).

Music video
The music video for the song features representations of DJ Shadow, Q-Tip and Lateef the Truth Speaker performing in a factory filled with cardboard boxes. The video was directed by ROJO (Josef Baar & François Roland).

References 

2006 singles
DJ Shadow songs
Songs written by Q-Tip (musician)
Q-Tip (musician) songs
Songs written by DJ Shadow